An election to Three Rivers District Council took place on 5 May 2022. 14 of the 39 seats were up for election. The election took place alongside other local elections across the United Kingdom.

Background

The seats up for election in 2022 were those last contested in the 2018 election, when the Liberal Democrats won eight seats, the Conservatives won four seats, and Labour won one seat. The Gade Valley ward elected two councillors in 2022 instead of one, due to the resignation of Independent (elected as a Liberal Democrat) councillor Alex Michaels in March 2022.

Following the elections of May 2022, Three Rivers District Council is controlled by the Liberal Democrats, who hold 23 of the 39 seats.

Electoral process

Three Rivers District Council is elected in thirds, with a third of all seats up for election every year for three years, with an election to Hertfordshire County Council instead in the fourth year. The election took place by first-past-the-post voting, with wards represented by three councillors, with one elected in each election year to serve a four-year term.

Council composition

Results by ward
Candidates seeking re-election are marked with an asterisk (*).

Abbots Langley and Bedmond

Carpenders Park

Chorleywood North and Sarratt

Chorleywood South and Maple Cross

Dickinsons

Durrants

Gade Valley

Leavesden

Moor Park and Eastbury

Oxhey Hall and Hayling

Penn and Mill End

Rickmansworth Town

South Oxhey

References

Three Rivers District Council elections
Three Rivers
2020s in Hertfordshire